Ancient Chinese coinage includes some of the earliest known coins. These coins, used as early as the Spring and Autumn period (770–476 BCE), took the form of imitations of the cowrie shells that were used in ceremonial exchanges. The same period also saw the introduction of the first metal coins; however, they were not initially round, instead being either knife shaped or spade shaped. Round metal coins with a round, and then later square hole in the center were first introduced around 350 BCE. The beginning of the Qin dynasty (221–206 BCE), the first dynasty to unify China, saw the introduction of a standardised coinage for the whole Empire. Subsequent dynasties produced variations on these round coins throughout the imperial period. At first the distribution of the coinage was limited to use around the capital city district, but by the beginning of the Han dynasty, coins were widely used for such things as paying taxes, salaries and fines.

Ancient Chinese coins are markedly different from their European counterparts. Chinese coins were manufactured by being cast in molds, whereas European coins were typically cut and hammered or, in later times, milled. Chinese coins were usually made from mixtures of metals such copper, tin and lead, from bronze, brass or iron: precious metals like gold and silver were uncommonly used. The ratios and purity of the coin metals varied considerably. Most Chinese coins were produced with a square hole in the middle. This was used to allow collections of coins to be threaded on a square rod so that the rough edges could be filed smooth, and then threaded on strings for ease of handling.

Official coin production was not always centralised, but could be spread over many mint locations throughout the country. Aside from officially produced coins, private coining was common during many stages of history. Various steps were taken over time to try to combat the private coining and limit its effects and making it illegal. At other times private coining was tolerated. The coins varied in value throughout the history.

Some coins were produced in very large numbers – during the Western Han, an average of 220 million coins a year were produced. Other coins were of limited circulation and are today extremely rare – only six examples of Da Quan Wu Qian from the Eastern Wu dynasty (222–280) are known to exist. Occasionally, large hoards of coins have been uncovered. For example, a hoard was discovered in Jiangsu containing 4,000 Tai Qing Feng Le coins and at Zhangpu in Shaanxi, a sealed jar containing 1,000 Ban Liang coins of various weights and sizes, was discovered.

Pre-Imperial (770–220 BCE)

The earliest coinage of China was described by Sima Qian, the great historian of c. 100 BCE:

With the opening of exchange between farmers, artisans, and merchants, there came into use money of tortoise shells, cowrie shells, gold, coins, knives, spades. This has been so from remote antiquity.

While nothing is known about the use of tortoise shells as money, gold and cowries (either real shells or replicas) were used to the south of the Yellow River. Although there is no doubt that the well-known spade and knife money were used as coins, it has not been demonstrated that other items often offered by dealers as coins such as fish, halberds, and metal chimes were also used as coins. They are not found in coin hoards, and the probability is that all these are in fact funerary items. Archaeological evidence shows that the earliest use of spade and knife money was in the Spring and Autumn period (770–476 BCE). As in ancient Greece, socio-economic conditions at the time were favourable to the adoption of coinage.

Cowries
Inscriptions and archaeological evidence shows that cowrie shells were regarded as important objects of value in the Shang dynasty (c. 1766 – 1154 BC). In the Zhou period, they are frequently referred to as gifts or rewards from kings and nobles to their subjects. Later imitations in bone, stone or bronze were probably used as money in some instances.

Some think the first Chinese metallic coins were bronze imitations of cowrie shells found in a tomb near Anyang dating from around 900 BC, but these items lack inscriptions.

Similar bronze pieces with inscriptions, known as Ant Nose Money or Ghost Face Money were definitely used as money. They have been found in areas to the south of the Yellow River corresponding to the State of Chu in the Warring States period. One hoard was of some 16,000 pieces. Their weight is very variable, and their alloy often contains a high proportion of lead. The name Ant [and] Nose refers to the appearance of the inscriptions, and has nothing to do with keeping ants out of the noses of corpses.

Gold

The only minted gold coinage of this period known was Chu gold block money, which consists of sheets of gold 3–5 mm thick, of various sizes, with inscriptions consisting of square or round stamps where there are one or two characters. They have been unearthed in various locations south of the Yellow River indicating that they were products of the State of Chu. One of the characters in their inscription is often a monetary unit or weight which is normally read as yuan. Pieces are of a very variable size and thickness, and the stamps appear to be a device to validate the whole block, rather than a guide to enable it to be broken up into unit pieces. Some specimens have been reported in copper, lead, or clay. It is probable that these were funeral money, not circulating coinage, as they are found in tombs, but the gold coins are not.

Jade pieces
It has been suggested that pieces of jade were a form of money in the Shang dynasty.

Money brand
Metal money brands were rarely used in the state of Chu. They were used again in the Song dynasty.

Spade money

Hollow handled spade money
Hollow handled spades are a link between weeding tools used for barter and stylised objects used as money. They are clearly too flimsy for use, but retain the hollow socket by which a genuine tool could be attached to a handle. This socket is rectangular in cross-section, and still retains the clay from the casting process. In the socket the hole by which the tool was fixed to its handle is also reproduced.
 Prototype spade money: This type of spade money is similar in shape and size to the original agricultural implements. While some are perhaps robust enough to be used in the fields, others are much lighter and bear an inscription, probably the name of the city which issued it. Some of these objects have been found in Shang and Western Zhou tombs, so they date from c. 1200–800 BC. Inscribed specimens appear to date from c. 700 BC.
 Square shoulder spades: Square shoulder spade coins have square shoulders, a straight or slightly curving foot, and three parallel lines on the obverse and reverse. They are found in quantities of up to several hundreds in the area corresponding to the Royal Domain of Zhou (south Hebei and north Henan). Archaeological evidence dates them to the early Spring and Autumn period, around 650 BC onwards. The inscriptions on these coins usually consist of one character, which can be a number, a cyclical character, a place name, or the name of a clan. The possibility that some inscriptions are the names of merchants has not been entertained. The crude writing is that of the artisans who made the coins, not the more careful script of the scholars who wrote the votive inscriptions on bronzes. The style of writing is consistent with that of the middle Zhou period. Over 200 inscriptions are known; many have not been fully deciphered. The characters can be found on the left or the right of the central line and are sometimes inverted or retrograde. The alloy of these coins is typically 80% copper, 15% lead, and 5% tin. They are found in hoards of hundreds, rather than thousands, sometimes tied together in bundles. Although there is no mention in the literature of their purchasing power, it is clear that they were not small change.
 Sloping shoulder spades: Sloping shoulder spades usually have a sloping shoulder, with the two outside lines on the obverse and reverse at an angle. The central line is often missing. This type is generally smaller than the prototype or square shoulder spades. Their inscriptions are clearer, and usually consist of two characters. They are associated with the Kingdom of Zhou and the Henan area. Their smaller size indicates that they are later in date than the square shoulder spades.
 Pointed shoulder spades: This type of spade has pointed shoulders and feet, and a long hollow handle. There are three parallel lines on the obverse and reverse, and occasionally inscriptions. They are found in northeastern Henan and in Shanxi, territory of the Duchy of Jin, later to become Zhao. They are held to be somewhat later in date than the square shouldered spades. Their shape seems to be designed for ease of tying together in bundles, rather than developed from any particular agricultural instrument.

Flat-handled spade money
These have lost the hollow handle of the early spades. They nearly all have distinct legs, suggesting that their pattern was influenced by the pointed shoulder hollow handled spades, but had been further stylized for easy handling. They are generally smaller, and sometimes have denominations specified in their inscriptions as well as place names. This, together with such little evidence as can be gleaned from the dates of the establishment of some of the mint towns, show that they were a later development. Archaeological evidence dates them to the Warring States period (475–221 BC). Arched foot spades have an alloy consisting of about 80% copper; for other types the copper content varies between 40% and 70%.
 Arched foot spades: This type has an arched crutch, often like an inverted U. The shoulders can be rounded or angular. Denominations of half, one, or two jin are normally specified. They are associated with the State of Liang (also known as Wei) which flourished between 425 and 344 BCE, and the State of Han (403–230 BCE).
 Special spades of Liang: Similar in shape to the arched foot spades. Their inscriptions have been the subject of much debate. All are now agreed that these coins were issued by the State of Liang, and the inscriptions indicate a relationship between the jin weight of the coins, and the lie, another unit of weight or money.
 Pointed foot spades: This type has pointed feet, and a square crutch; the shoulders can be pointing upwards or straight. They are a clear descendant of the pointed shoulder hollow handled spade. The weight and size of the larger specimens is compatible with the one jin unit of the arched foot flat handled spades; smaller specimens sometimes specify the unit as one jin or more often as a half jin, but frequently do not specify a unit. This seems to imply that the half jin unit became the norm. They are associated with the State of Zhao, and their find spots are usually in Shanxi or Hebei provinces. They frequently have numerals on their reverses. The two character mint names mean that the cities that cast these coins can be identified with more certainty than those of earlier series.
 Square foot spades: This type has square feet, a square crutch, and a central line on the obverse. The reverses are normally only three lines, apart from on spades produced by some mints in the state of Zhao that also produced pointed foot spades. These have numerals on the reverse. The mints that produced square foot spades are more numerous than those that produced the pointed foot spades. Their weights are compatible with the half jin denomination. They are associated with the states of Han, Zhao, Liang, Zhou, and Yan. Their find spots include the provinces of Inner Mongolia, Jilin, Hebei, Shanxi, Shaanxi, Shandong, Jiangsu, Anhui, Henan, and Zhejiang. The type is no doubt contemporary with the pointed foot spades; some mints issued both types, and the two are found together in hoards.
 Sharp-cornered spades: These form a distinct sub-series of the square foot spades. They differ slightly from the normal type as they have small triangular projections on the handle. The inscriptions of the three larger types include the characters jin and nie. While nie was the name of a river in Henan, the character cannot be readily construed as part of a place name, as it is found in conjunction with other place names such as Lu Shi and Yu. According to the Fang Yan (an ancient book on dialects), nie meant the same as hua, money or coin. Thus the characters jin nie mean "metal coin". The weights of the larger coins seem slightly higher than the 14 grams of the jin standard. Their find spots correspond with the states of Liang and Han.
 Dang Jin spades: These constitute another sub-group whose inscriptions suggest equivalence between the units of two trading areas. Both the small and large coins have a character jin in their inscription. This is normally taken as being the same as the jin unit found on other flat handled spade coins. However, the 28 gram weight of these coins suggests that their unit was twice the 14 grams of the flat handled spade jin, so perhaps it was a local unit of the area. The smaller coin is often found as two joined at the feet. This is how they were cast, but it is not clear if they were intended to circulate like this. Their weight is between 7 and 8 grams, roughly a quarter of the larger coins, so the inscription indicating that four were equivalent to a jin is logical. Their obverse inscriptions are a matter of some debate. Taking a consensus, the most logical reading is: [City of] Pei coin equivalent to a jin.
 Round foot spades: Round handle, round shoulders, and round feet. A rare type, this type is represented by the coins of five cities in present-day Shanxi, between the Fen and Yellow River. There are two sizes, the equivalent of the one jin and half jin denominations. They have various numerals on their reverses. One school of thought ascribes them to the States of Qin and Zhao at the end of the Warring States period; another to the State of Zhongshan during the 4th century BC.
 Three hole spades: Holes in the handle and feet. Round handle, round shoulders, and round feet. Another rare type. Two sizes are found. The large size has the inscription liang on the reverse; the smaller shi'er zhu (12 zhu). As the liang unit of weight was divided into 24 zhu, clearly the two sizes represent denominations of a "one" and of a "half". They also have series numbers on the handle on the reverse. Like the round foot spades, it is not definitely established which State issued them. Their find spots are in eastern Shanxi and Hebei. The mint names are cities that were occupied by both Zhongshan and Zhao.

Knife money 

Knife money is much the same shape as the actual knives in use during the Zhou period. They appear to have evolved in parallel with the spade money in the north-east of China.
 Qi knives: These large knives are attributed to the State of Qi, and are found in the Shandong area. They do not appear to have circulated much outside of this area. Although there has been considerable controversy concerning the date of their issue, archaeology shows them to be products of the Warring States period. They are known as Three Character Knives, Four Character Knives and so on, according to the number of characters in their inscriptions. Some consider the three horizontal lines and the mark below on some reverses are part of the inscription. The inscription refers to the establishment of the State of Qi. This could have been in 1122 BC, 894 BC, 685 BC, or 386 BC, depending on how one interprets the early histories. The two later dates are the most likely for the introduction of these coins. The alloy of the Three Character Knives contains around 54% copper, 38% lead, and 8% tin. The Four and Five Character Knives contain about 70% copper.
 Needle tip knives: This type of knife money is distinguished by their long, pointed tip. They were unknown until 1932, when a hoard was unearthed at Chengde in Hebei province; later hoards have also been found in this area. It has been suggested that such knives were produced for the trade between the Chinese and the Xiongnu who occupied this northern area at the time. It could be that this type was merely a local variation of the Pointed Tip knives, or that it was the original type that became modified as it was inconvenient to use. Some fifty inscriptions have been recorded, which consist of numbers, cyclical characters, and other characters, many of which have not been deciphered.
 Pointed tip knives: The end of the blade is curved but lacks the long pointed tip of the needle tip knives. The find spots of this type of knife money in the north-east of China associate it with the State of Yan. In recent years, hoards of up to 2,000 of these knives have been made, sometimes tied together in bundles of 25, 50, or 100. Over 160 different inscriptions have been recorded. Some inscriptions represent numbers or cyclical characters, but many have not been deciphered. Unlike the hollow handle spade money, the characters have not been generally associated with known places names. Their sizes and weights (11 to 16 grams) are very variable, leading to various sub-types being proposed by various authorities.
 Ming knives: Ming knives are generally smaller than pointed tip knives, and their tips are approximately straight. This type of knife money takes its name from the character on the obverse, which has traditionally been read as ming. Other proposals have been yi, ju, ming, and zhao. A mint for Ming knives was unearthed at Xiadu, to the south west of Peking. This was the site of Yi, capital of the State of Yan from 360 BC, so the reading of yi has found favour recently. Moulds have also been discovered in Shandong. These coins themselves have been found, often in great quantities, in the provinces of Hebei, Henan, Shandong, Shanxi, Shaanxi, Manchuria, and even as far afield as Korea and Japan. They are found together with pointed and square foot spade money.

Two different shapes of Ming knife are found. The first, presumably the earlier, is curved like the pointed tip knives. The second has a straight blade and often a pronounced angled bend in the middle. This shape is known as 磬 qing, a chime stone. Their alloy contains around 40% copper; they weigh around 16 grams.

A wide range of characters is found on the reverses of Ming knives. Some are single characters or numerals, similar to those found on the pointed tip knives. Two large groups have inscriptions that begin with the characters you or zuo, followed by numerals or other characters. You has the subsidiary meaning of junior or west; zuo can also mean senior or east. (The excavations at Xiadu revealed in the inner city a zuo gong left-hand palace, and a you gong right-hand palace.) The similarities between the other characters in these two groups show that they were determined by the same system. A smaller group has inscriptions beginning with wai, but the other characters do not have much in common with the you and zuo groups. A fourth group has inscriptions beginning with an unclear character, and other characters similar to those found in the you and zuo groups. By analogy with the wai, this unclear character has been read as nei or zhong.
 State of Qi Ming knives (Boshan knives): Their general appearance is similar to the Ming knives. The ming character is large and angular. They have extensive reverse inscriptions. A hoard of these knives was unearthed in the Jiaqing period (1796–1820) in Boshan in eastern Shandong. Later finds have been made in the same area. This area was part of the state of Qi; and their legends also refer to Qi. Between 284 and 279 BC, the State of Yan occupied most of the territory of Qi, and it is generally accepted that these coins come from this time. Otherwise, their reverse inscriptions, which appear to refer to place names, have not been satisfactorily deciphered. One reading gives the first character as Ju for Ju city.
 Straight knives: These are smaller knives, and their blades are not curved or only slightly curved. They were issued by a few places in the state of Zhao. This category includes some other smaller knives of various shapes. They are found in hoards with Ming knives.

Early round coins 

Apart from two small and presumably late coins from Qin, coins from the spade money area had a round hole ("the good") in the middle of their face ("the meat") and were denominated in yǐn in the central plain and liǎng in Qin. Those from the knife money area had a square hole and were denominated in huà.

Although for discussion purposes the Zhou coins are divided up into categories of knives, spades, and round coins, it is apparent from archaeological finds that most of the various kinds circulated together. A hoard found in 1981, near Hebi in north Henan province, consisted of: 3,537 Gong spades, 3 Anyi arched foot spades, 8 Liang Dang Lie spades, 18 Liang square foot spades and 1,180 Yuan round coins, all contained in three clay jars. Another example is a find made in Liaoning province in 1984, which consisted of 2,280 Yi Hua round coins, 14 spade coins, and 120 Ming knives. In 1960 in Shandong, 2 Yi Hua round coins were found with 600 Qi round coins and 59 Qi knives. At Luoyang a find was made in 1976 of 116 flat handled spades of various types (Xiangyuan, Lin, Nie, Pingyang, Yu, Anyang, and Gong), 46 Anzang round coins, 1 yuan round coin, and small/sloping shoulder spades from Sanchuan, Wu, Anzang, Dong Zhou, Feng, and Anzhou.

Qin dynasty 

These coins were traditionally associated with Qin Shi Huang Di, the first Chinese Emperor, who united China in 221 BC. The History of Han says: "When Qin united the world, it made two sorts of currency: that of yellow gold, which was called yì and was the currency of the higher class; and that of bronze, which was similar in quality to the coins of Zhou, but bore an inscription saying Half Ounce, and was equal in weight to its inscription."

Ban Liang or Banliang coins take their name from their original size and typical two-character inscription  (bànliǎng), meaning "half liang", written right to left in Classical Chinese. The inscription was maintained through repeated rounds of debasement and despite constant counterfeiting, however, so that in practice Ban Liangs are found in a great variety of sizes and calligraphic styles and are difficult to date and classify exactly, especially with regard to local and unofficial mints.

Archaeological evidence now shows that the Ban Liang was first issued in the Warring States period by the State of Qin, possibly as early as 378 BC. A remarkable find was some bamboo tablets amongst which were found regulations (drawn up before 242 BC) concerning metal and cloth money. A thousand coins, good and bad mixed, were to be placed in pen (baskets or jars) and sealed with the Seal of the Director. At Zhangpu in Shaanxi, just such a sealed jar, containing 1,000 Ban Liang of various weights and sizes, was discovered. 7 Ban Liang were found in a tomb datable to 306 BC.

At the beginning of the Western Han dynasty around 200 BC, the people were allowed to cast small light coins known as "elm seed" coings (yú jiá), as the heavy Qin coins were inconvenient. In 186 BC, the official coin weight was reduced to 8 zhu, and in 182 BC, a 5 fen coin (wǔ fēn) weighing 2.4 zhu, one fifth of Ban Liang's proper half ounce size. In 175 BC, the weight was set at 4 zhu. Private minting was permitted again, but with strict regulation of the weight and alloy. In 119 BC, the Ban Liang was replaced by the San Zhu weighing 3 zhu and then the Wu Zhu weighing 5 zhu.

Han dynasty

By this time, a full monetary economy had developed. Taxes, salaries, and fines were all paid in coins. An average of 220 million coins a year were produced. According to the Book of Han, the Western Han was a wealthy period:

The granaries in the cities and the countryside were full and the government treasuries were running over with wealth. In the capital the strings of cash had been stacked up by the hundreds of millions until the cords that bound them had rotted away and they could no longer be counted.

On average, millet cost 75 cash and polished rice 140 cash a hectolitre, a horse 4,400–4,500 cash. A labourer could be hired for 150 cash a month; a merchant could earn 2,000 cash a month.
Apart from the Ban Liang coins described previously, there were two other coins of the Western Han whose inscription denoted their weight:

 The San Zhu coin was issued either between 140 and 136 BC, or between 119 and 118 BC. The records are ambiguous, but the later date is generally preferred.
 The Wu Zhu was first issued in 118 BC, this inscription was used on coins of many regimes over the next 700 years. Sometimes Wu Zhus can be dated specifically from dated moulds that have been discovered, or from their find spots, but the majority cannot. Those of the Western Han dynasty have a square top to the right hand component of zhu; on later coins, this is rounded. Only a few of the varieties that have been described by numismatists are included here.
 Jun Guo Wu Zhu (118–115 BC) is a large and heavy coin, with the edges not filed. Sometimes has a rimless reverse. Taken to be the earliest Wu Zhu. According to the History of Han, in 118 BC the Commanderies (Jun) and Principalities (Guo) were ordered to cast 5 zhu coins with a circular rim so that it would be impossible to clip them to glean a bit of copper.
 Chi Ze Wu Zhu (115–113 BC) is a lighter coin than the above, with filed edges. The Han records state that in 115 BC the mints in the capital were requested to cast Chi Ze coins, with one being worth five local coins. Only these were to circulate. Chi Ze means Red (or Shining) Edge, referring to the red copper showing when the edges were filed smooth. Some examples of this coin were found from the tomb of Liu Sheng, Prince of Zhongshan, who died in 113 BC.
 Shang Lin San Guan Wu Zhu (From 113 BC) refers to the Three Offices of Shang Lin Park which were the Office for Coinage, the Office for Sorting Copper, and the Office of Price Equalisation. Minting was now confined to the central authorities. These coins usually have a raised rim on the top of the hole on the obverse. Their quality was so high that forgery became unprofitable except to true artisans, great villains, or thieves. All earlier coins were to be melted down and the copper taken to Shang Lin.
 Wu Zhu Coins (AD 25). Even after the end of the Wang Mang regime (see below), the coinage system remained in disarray. Cloth, silk and grain were used as money along with coins. However, cash was the normal measure of wealth and was used in large quantities. When Yang Ping (92–195) was in economic difficulties, he was offered a gift of one million cash. Wu Zhu coins continued to be issued, along with other coins, until the end of the sixth century. Some coins can be attributed to specific reigns or events; many can not.
 The Iron Wu Zhu, resembling the W. Han coin, is attributed to Gongsun Shu, who rebelled in Sichuan in AD 25, and issued iron coins, two being equal to one Jian Wu Wu Zhu(). Head of the zhu component rounded. Typical of Eastern Han Wu Zhus.

 In AD 30, a ditty was sung by the youths of Sichuan: "The yellow bull! the white belly! Let Wu Zhu coins return". This ridiculed the tokens of Wang Mang and the iron coins of Gongsun Shu, which were withdrawn by the Eastern Han Emperor Guangwu in the 16th year of Jian Wu (AD 40). The Emperor was advised that the foundation of the wealth of a country depends on a good political economy, which was found in the good old Wu Zhu coinage, and so reissued the Wu Zhu coins.

 The Si Chu Wu Zhu has four lines on reverse radiating from the corners of the hole. It is attributed to the Eastern Han Emperor Ling, AD 186. The four lines are said to represent wealth flowing from a ruined city—an omen of the overthrow of the Han dynasty.
 Shu Wu Zhu coins have the word Chuan on the obverse, or the numbers 1–32 on the reverse, in incuse characters. They are attributed to the Shu Han (221–265) by virtue of their find spots in Gansu.
 Shen Lang Wu Zhu has no jin component in zhu. They are attributed to Shen Chong of the House of Wu and cast after the foundation of the Eastern Jin dynasty in 317. Also known as the Shen Chong Wu Zhu; an old ballad contains the lines:

The quote implies that Lord Shen's coinage was small and light. 

 Dang Liang Wu Zhu is a large thick coin, with a nominal weight of 8 zhu. They are attributed to Emperor Wen of the Southern dynasties Song dynasty, who had them cast in 447 as a measure against coining malpractices.
 Tian Jian Wu Zhu has an inner rim on obverse. At the start of the Liang dynasty, money was only used around the capital. Elsewhere grain and cloth were used for trade. In the south, everyone used gold and silver. Therefore, in the 1st year of the Tian Jian period (502), the Emperor Wu cast Wu Zhu coins with an outer and inner rim. He also cast another sort without a rim called the female coin. The two sorts circulated together.
 Nu Qian have no outer rim.
 An iron version of the Wu Zhu with four lines radiating from the corners of the hole on the reverse. Attributed to Emperor Wu of Liang in 523. By 535, the traders in Sichuan were complaining of the trouble of stringing together such a number of [cheap] coins, and of the large number of carts needed to transport them.
 Liang Zhu Wu Zhu has a dot above and below the hole on the obverse. They are attributed to Emperor Yuan of the Liang dynasty in 552. They were intended to be the equivalent of ten ordinary coins.
 Si Zhu Wu Zhu have two dots on the obverse and reverse. They are attributed to Emperor Jing of the Liang dynasty in 557. They were originally intended to be the equivalent of twenty ordinary coins, they soon became worth one. However, similar coins with dots have been found in tombs of a much earlier date.
 Chen Wu Zhu. has a stout outer rim and no inner rim. The top part of the zhu component is square while the bottom part round. They are attributed to Emperor Wen of the Southern dynasties Chen dynasty and cast from Tian Jia 3 (562). One Chen Wu Zhu was worth ten small goose-eye coins.
 Yong Ping Wu Zhu have characters long and thin. They are attributed to Emperor Xuan of the Northern Wei dynasty, during the Yong Ping period (510).
 Da Tong Wu Zhu have a stout outer rim, inner rim only by the wu. Crossing lines of wu straight. Attributed to Emperor Wen of the Western Wei, Datong period (540).
 Western Wei Wu Zhu have crossing lines of wu straight. The inner rim is by the wu only. They were previously attributed to the Sui dynasty, however coins of this distinctive type were found within the tomb of HouYi of the Western Wei (535–56).
 Sui Wu Zhu is hourglass wu, inner rim by the wu only. They were first cast by Emperor Wen in 581. After introducing these new coins, the Emperor ordered all the frontiers to hand over 100 cash as samples in 583, and the next year strictly forbade the circulation of old coins and commanded that when this was disobeyed, the responsible officials should be fined half a years salary. 1,000 coins weighed 4 jin 2 liang. Minting privileges were granted to several imperial princes during this reign.
 Bai Qian Wu Zhu has writing as above. The whitish colour of this coin is due to the addition of lead and tin to the alloy, which was done officially from 585.
 Yan Huan Wu Zhu is a Wu Zhu whose middle has been cut out to make two coins.
 Zao Bian Wu Zhu is the inner portion of a Wu Zhu whose outer portion has gone to make a thread ring. Surviving moulds show that some Wu Zhus were actually cast like this.
 E Yan or Ji Mu are the names given to various diminutive Wu Zhu coins. This is a common type with sharp legends which has been found in Western Han tombs of 73–33 BC.
 Small coins with no characters. Traditionally ascribed to Dong Zhuo, who in 190 usurped the throne and melted down nine huge Qin dynasty statues to make coins. Could well have been cast at other times.

Xin dynasty

Wang Mang was a nephew of the Dowager Empress Wang. In AD 9, he usurped the throne, and founded the Xin dynasty. He introduced a number of currency reforms which met with varying degrees of success. The first reform, in AD 7, retained the Wu Zhu coin, but reintroduced two versions of the knife money:

 Yi Dao Ping Wu Qian on which the Yi Dao characters are inlaid in gold.
 契刀五百 Qi Dao Wu Bai

Between AD 9 and 10 he introduced an impossibly complex system involving tortoise shell, cowries, gold, silver, six round copper coins, and a reintroduction of the spade money in ten denominations.

The Six Coins. AD 9–14.
 Xiao Quan Zhi Yi
 Yao Quan Yi Shi
 You Quan Er Shi
 Zhong Quan San Shi
 Zhuang Quan Si Shi
 Da Quan Wu Shi is a round coin with a nominal value of fifty Wu Zhu.

The Ten Spades. AD 10–14.
 Xiao Bu Yi Bai
 Yao Bu Er Bai
 You Bu San Bai
 Xu Bu Si Bai
 Cha Bu Wu Bai
 Zhong Bu Liu Bai
 Zhuang Bu Qi Bai
 Di Bu Ba Bai
 Ci Bu Jiu Bai
 Da Bu Heng Qian

According to the History of Han:

The people became bewildered and confused, and these coins did not circulate. They secretly used Wu Zhu coins for their purchases. Wang Mang was very concerned at this and issued the following decree:

Those who dare to oppose the court system and those who dare to use Wu Zhus surreptitiously to deceive the people and equally the spirits will all be exiled to the Four Frontiers and be at the mercy of devils and demons.

The result of this was that trade and agriculture languished, and food became scarce. People went about crying in the markets and the highways, the numbers of sufferers being untold.

In AD 14, all these tokens were abolished, and replaced by another type of spade coin and new round coins.
 Huo Bu
 Huo Quan

According to Schjöth, Wang Mang wished to displace the Wu Zhu currency of the Western Han, owing, it is said, to his prejudice to the jin radical in the character zhu of this inscription, which was a component part of the character Liu, the family name of the rulers of the House of Han, whose descendant Wang Mang had just dethroned. And so he introduced the Huo Quan currency. One of the reasons, again, that this coin circulated for several years into the succeeding dynasty was, so the chroniclers say, the fact that the character quan in the inscription consisted of the two component parts bai and shui, which happened to be the name of the village, Bai Shui in Henan, in which the Emperor Guang Wu, who founded the Eastern Han, was born. This circumstance lent a charm to this coin and prolonged its time of circulation. The Huo Quan did indeed continue to be minted after the death of Wang Mang – a mould dated AD 40 is known.

Bu Quan was known later as the Nan Qian, from the belief that if a woman wore this on her sash, she would give birth to a boy. Eventually, Wang Mang's unsuccessful reforms provoked an uprising, and he was killed by rebels in AD 23.

Three Kingdoms

In 220, the Han dynasty came to an end, and was followed by a long period of disunity and civil war, beginning with the Three Kingdoms period, which developed from the divisions within the Han dynasty. These three states were Cao Wei in northern China, Shu Han to the west, and Eastern Wu in the east. The period was the golden age of chivalry in Chinese history, as described in the historical novel Romance of the Three Kingdoms. The coinage reflected the unsettled times, with small and token coins predominating.

Cao Wei
This state only issued Wu Zhu coins.

Shu Han
The coins issued by this state were:

 Zhi Bai Wu Zhu Often found with incuse characters on the reverse.
 Zhi Bai When Liu Bei, later ruler of Shu and one of the heroes of Romance of the Three Kingdoms, took Chengdu in Sichuan in 214, he was advised to issue "value one hundred" coins to overcome the problems of maintaining his troops; hence these coins are attributed to him.
 Tai Ping Bai Qian
 Rev: Stars and waves pattern.
 Rev: Incuse characters.
 Rev: Plain
 The Tai Ping Bai Qian coin was at first attributed to Sun Liang of Eastern Wu, who adopted a Tai Ping year title in 256. Most of them, however, have been unearthed in Sichuan (in one instance in a tomb dated to 227) together with Zhi Bai coins, which, together with the incuse marks on the reverse, indicates that they are issues of Shu Han. The fancy calligraphy and reverses of the large coins are more typical of amulets than circulating coins, and Peng seeks to associate them with the Taiping Taoists of the time.
 Zhi Yi
 Ding Ping Yi Bai

In the 1860s, a jar of small "goose eye" coins was dug up in Chengdu in Sichuan. It contained Tai Ping Bai Qian, Ding Ping Yi Bai, Zhi Bai, and Zhi Yi coins. This reinforces the supposition that all these coins are near contemporaries, issued by Shu Han.

Eastern Wu
 Da Quan Wu Bai
 Da Quan Dang Qian
 Da Quan Er Qian
 Da Quan Wu Qian: Only six specimens are known.

According to the records, in 236 Sun Quan, ruler of Wu, cast the Da Quan Wu Bai, and in 238 the Da Quan Dang Qian coins. The people were called upon to hand over the copper in their possession and receive back cash, and thus illicit coining was discouraged. These are coarse coins, cast in the capital Nanking or in Hubei. In 2000, clay moulds and other casting materials for Da Quan Wu Bai coins were discovered in the Western Lake, Hangzhou.

Jin dynasty
Sima Yan founded the Jin dynasty in AD 265, and after the defeat of Eastern Wu in 280, China was reunified for a while. At first, the dynasty was known as the Western Jin with Luo-yang as its capital; from 317, it ruled as the Eastern Jin from Nanking. The historical records do not mention the specific casting of coins during the Jin dynasty. In the south, reductions in the weights of coins caused great price fluctuations, and cloth and grain were used as substitutes for coins. In the north, numerous independent kingdoms (The Sixteen Kingdoms) issued some interesting coins.

Sixteen Kingdoms

Former Liang
Liang Zao Xin Quan is attributed to King Zhang Gui (317–376), who ruled in the north-western area.

Later Zhao
Feng Huo has text that uses seal script. There is no rim. They were cast by Emperor Shi Le in 319 at Xiangguo (now Xingtai in Hebei) with a weight of 4 zhu. They are known as the Cash of Riches – keeping the coin about one was said to bring great wealth. However, the historical record states that the people were displeased, and that in the end the coin did not circulate.

Cheng Han 
Han Xing as an inscription either right and left or above and below. In 337, Li Shou of Sichuan adopted the period title of Han Xing. This is the first recorded use of a period title on a coin. The period ended in 343.

Xia 
Tai Xia Zhen Xing counterwise. These were issued during the Zhenxing period (419–424) by Helian Bobo, probably at Xi'an.

Northern and Southern dynasties

The North and South dynasties era was another long period of disunity and strife. The north and south of China were each ruled by two separate successions of dynasties. During this period, coin inscriptions other than (nominal) weights, such as names or year titles, were introduced, although the Wu Zhu coin was still issued. Seal script remained the norm for inscriptions and some coins of highly regarded calligraphy were produced. However, the general coinage was of a very poor quality. In 465, permission was granted for the people to mint coins. There were others, still worse, called "Fringe Rim" coins, which would not sink in water and would break in one's hand. In the market, people would not bother counting them, but would pick them up by the handful. A peck of rice sold for 10,000 of these. Reforms by Emperor Ming from 465 onwards, had only a limited success in improving the quality of the coinage.

Southern dynasties

Song
 Si Zhu No inner rims on obverse. Issued by Emperor Wen in 430, from the capital at Nanking. A Coinage Office was established under the Chamberlain for Palace Revenues.
 Xiao Jian with the reverse: Si Zhu A poor coin, with many variations. Issued by Emperor Xiao from 454. Actual weight nearer 2 zhu. Withdrawn by the Emperor Ming in 467.
 Jing He
 Yong Guang
 Liang Zhu
The last three small coins, weighing only 2 zhu, were all issued by Emperor Fei in 465. As the Jinghe and Yongguang periods only lasted for a few months, these coins are very rare. The Song capital was at Nanking.

Liang
Tai Qing Feng Le are attributed to the Tai Qing period (547–549) of Emperor Wu. A hoard was discovered in Jiangsu containing 4,000 Tai Qing Feng Le coins with various other sorts of coins showing that this is not an amulet as had been claimed by some authorities.

Chen
Tai Huo Liu Zhu were issued by Emperor Xuan in 579. At first the coin was equivalent to ten Wu Zhus. Later the value was changed to one, and the contemporary saying "They cried before the Emperor, their arms akimbo" is said to refer to the discontent among the people caused by this. The seal character for liu suggests the "arms akimbo" posture. The coin was withdrawn in 582 when the Emperor died, and Wu Zhus were adopted. The Chen capital was Nanking.

Northern dynasties

Northern Wei
 Tai He Wu Zhu: Although the Northern Wei had been established in 386, its Turkish and Mongolian tribes had retained a nomadic way of life with no need for money until 495, when Emperor Xiao Wen issued this coin, probably at the capital Datong in Shanxi.
 Yong An Wu Zhu coins were first issued in the autumn of the second year of Yongan (529) by Emperor Xiao Zhuang. It is said that they continued to be cast until 543 under the Eastern and Western Wei dynasties. During the Eastern Wei dynasty, private coins with nicknames such as Yongzhou Green-red, Liangzhou Thick, Constrained Cash, Auspicious Cash, Heyang Rough, Heavenly Pillar, and Red Halter circulated, all possibly Yong An Wu Zhus.

Northern Qi 
Chang Ping Wu Zhu were cast by Emperor Wen Xuan in 553. They are finely made. The Northern Qi capital was Linzhang in Hebei. Under the Northern Qi, there was an Eastern and a Western Coinage Region, under the Chamberlain for Palace Revenues. Each Regional Director supervised 3 or 4 Local Services.

Northern Zhou
 Bu Quan were issued in 561 by Emperor Wu of the Northern Zhou dynasty. One was to be worth five Wu Zhus. To distinguish this coin from the Bu Quan of Wang Mang—the stroke in the middle of quan is continuous. They were withdrawn in 576.
 Wu Xing Da Bu were issued in 574 by Emperor Wu. They were intended to be worth ten Bu Quans. Illegal coining soon produced specimens of a reduced weight and the authorities banned the use of this coin in 576. This inscription is frequently found on amulets.
 Yong Tong Wan Guo were issued in 579 by Emperor Xuan. There nominal weight was 12 zhu, and the coin was meant to be equivalent to ten Wu Xing coins.

The above coins, the "Northern Zhou Three Coins", are written in the Yu Zhu (jade chopstick) style of calligraphy which is greatly admired.

3 and 4 Zhu cash coins attributed to this period 

3 and 4 Zhu coins are a small group of square and round coins which do not always have a hole in the middle. They are usually attributed to the time of the Southern and Northern dynasties. This was an unsettled period which produced some very poor coinage. The obverse inscriptions give a weight of 3 or 4 zhu. The reverse inscriptions appear to be place names.

Square shape:

Round coins with a round hole:

Sui dynasty
China was reunified under the Sui dynasty (581–618). Under this short-lived dynasty, many reforms were initiated that led to the subsequent success of the Tang dynasty. The only coin associated with the Sui is a Wu Zhu coin. Additional mints were set up in various prefectures, typically with five furnaces each. Cash was frequently checked for quality by the officials. However, after 605, private coining again caused a deterioration of the coinage.

Tang dynasty

Tang issues 

Kai Yuan Tong Bao were the main coin issued by the Tang. It was cast for most of the dynasty, a period of nearly 300 years. It was first issued by the Emperor Gao Zu in the autumn of the 4th year of the Wu De period (August 621). Its diameter was to be 8 fen. The weight was set at 2.4 zhu, ten to the liang. 1,000 coins weighed 6 jin 4 liang. The legend was written by the famous calligrapher Ouyang Xun in a much admired mixture of the Bafen and Li (official or clerkly) styles of writing. This is the first to include the phrase tong bao, used on many subsequent coins. The inscription was used by other regimes in later periods; such coins can be distinguished from Tang coins by their workmanship. Minting and copper extraction were centrally controlled, and private casting was punishable by death. For the first time we find regulations giving the prescribed coinage alloy: 83% copper, 15% lead, and 2% tin. Previously the percentages used seem to have been on an ad hoc basis. Actual analyses show rather less copper than this.

A crescent-shaped mark is often found on the reverse of Kai Yuans. The legend is that the Empress Wende (or, as in some folk legends, Wu Zetian) inadvertently stuck one of her fingernails in a wax model of the coin when it was first presented to her, and the resulting mark was reverentially retained. Other imperial ladies have also been proposed as the source of these nail marks, especially the Imperial Consort Yang. Peng explores the possibility of a foreign source for them. More prosaically, they appear to be a control system operated by the mint workers.

At first, mints were set up in Luoyang in Henan, and also in Peking, Chengdu, Bingzhou (Taiyuan in Shanxi), and then Guilin in Guangxi. Minting rights were also granted to some princes and officials. By 660, deterioration of the coinage due to forgery had become a problem. The regulations were reaffirmed in 718, and forgeries suppressed. In 737, the first commissioner with overall responsibility for casting was appointed. In 739, ten mints were recorded, with a total of 89 furnaces casting some 327,000 strings of cash a year. 123 liang of metal were needed to produce a string of coins weighing 100 liang. In the late 740s, skilled artisans were employed for casting, rather than conscripted peasants. Despite these measures, the coinage continued to deteriorate. In 808, a ban on hoarding coins was proclaimed. This was repeated in 817. Regardless of the rank of a person, they could not hold more than 5,000 strings of cash. Cash balances exceeding this amount had to be expended within two months to purchase goods. This was an attempt to compensate for the lack of cash in circulation. By 834, mint output had fallen to 100,000 strings a year, mainly due to the shortage of copper. Forgeries using lead and tin alloys were produced.

In 845, in the Huichang period, the Emperor Wu Zong, a fervent follower of Taoism, destroyed the Buddhist monasteries and used the copper bells, gongs, incense burners and statues to cast coins in various localities. These local mints were under the control of the provincial governors. The New Tang History states that Li Shen, governor of Huainan province, requested that the empire might cast coins bearing the name of the prefecture in which they were cast, and this was agreed. These coins with mint names on the reverses, known as Huichang Kai Yuans, are of poor workmanship and size compared with the early Kai Yuans. However, when Emperor Xuanzong ascended to the throne the next year, this policy was reversed, and the new coins were recast to make Buddhist statues.

Archaeological discoveries have assisted numismatists in dating various varieties of the Kai Yuan more closely.

Other Tang dynasty coins are:

 Qian Feng Quan Bao were cast by the Emperor Gao Zong (649–683) in 666. In an attempt to overcome a shortage of copper, one of the Qian Feng coins was to be equivalent to ten old coins, although its weight of 2.4 zhu was the same as a one cash coin. This led to extensive forgery, and the coin was withdrawn after a year.
 Qian Yuan zhong bao were issued by Emperor Su Zong (756–762) to pay the army fighting against the rebels. Coins of the first issue, in 758, were the equivalent of 10 ordinary cash. Each coin weighed 1.6 qian. The second issue, from 759, was of larger coins, one of which was to be the equivalent of 50 cash. These coins have a double rim on the reverse and are known as the Zhong Lun (Heavy Wheel) cash. Their weight was twice that of the 10 cash coins. After scenes that foreshadowed the Xianfeng period (1853), with hundreds of people executed for forgery, the large Qian Yuan coins were devalued to 30 cash. In 762, the smaller coins were devalued to 2 cash, and the Heavy Wheel cash to 3 cash. Small Qian Yuans, worth one Kai Yuan, were also issued.

Xinjiang issues 

Judging by their find spots, these coin were cast by the local government in the Kuche area of Xinjiang in around 760–780.
 Da Li yuan bao.
 Da is a degenerate form of the above but only has the da included.
 Yuan is similar to the above coin however it has only the character yuan included.
 Jian Zhong tong bao The Jian Zhong Period was 780–83.
 Zhong above the hole. A degenerate form of the above.

Tang rebels 
In 755, a revolt started in the north-west of China. The capital, Luoyang, was taken, and the Emperor fled to Sichuan. One of the rebels, Shi Siming, issued coins at Luoyang from 758. Shi was killed in 761, and the revolt was eventually suppressed in 763 with the help of foreign troops.
 De Yi yuan bao has the inscription De Yi, which also implies "last for one year". They were felt to be inauspicious, and were changed to Shun Tian (the period title) in 759.
 Shun Tian yuan bao

Five Dynasties and Ten Kingdoms

After the collapse of the Tang in 907, another period of disunity ensued known as the Five Dynasties and Ten Kingdoms period. Five officially recognised dynasties ruled consecutively in the north (with capitals at Kaifeng or Luoyang in Henan), while ten different kingdoms held sway at different times in the south. A shortage of copper made it difficult to produce an adequate supply of coins. In 955, an Edict banned the holding of bronze utensils:

From now on, except for court objects, weapons, official objects and mirrors, and cymbals, bells and chimes in temples and monasteries, all other bronze utensils are banned ... Those who hoard more than 5 jin, no matter how much the amount, will be executed. Those who abetted them will be exiled for two years, followed by labour service for one year. Those around them will suffer 100 strokes of the cane. Informers will be rewarded with 30 strings of cash.

The south enjoyed somewhat better political and economic conditions, and saw an advance in trade. A great variety of coinage, including large and base metal coins, was issued in this area.

Five Dynasties

Later Liang
Kai Ping tong bao and also a Kai Ping yuan bao coins could have been issued by Zhu Wen when he overthrew the Tang in 907. However, only a few specimens of each coin are known, and one of each is shown in China National Museum and China History Museum. Some authorities doubt their authenticity.

Later Tang
Tian Cheng yuan bao were issued by Emperor Ming in the Tiancheng period (926–929).

Later Jin
Tian Fu yuan bao were issued by Emperor Gao Zong in the Tianfu period from 938. From 939, private casting was permitted for a few months, resulting in coins of adulterated alloy.

Later Han
Han Yuan tong bao coin's pattern is based on the Kai Yuan. In 948, during the reign of Emperor Gao Zu, the President of the Department of Imperial Feasts requested permission to set up a mint in the capital (Kaifeng, Henan). There is no specific record of casting Han Yuans.

Later Zhou
Zhou Yuan tong bao coins were issued by Emperor Shi Zong from 955. The pattern is also based on the Kai Yuan coin. They were cast from melted-down bronze statues from Buddhist temples. When reproached for this, the Emperor uttered a cryptic remark to the effect that the Buddha would not mind this sacrifice. It is said that the Emperor himself supervised the casting at the many large furnaces at the back of the palace. The coins have amuletic properties because they were made from Buddhist statues, and are particularly effective in midwifery – hence the many later-made imitations.

Ten Kingdoms

Former Shu
Issued by Wang Jian (907–918).
 Yong Ping yuan bao
 Tong Zheng yuan bao
 Tian Han yuan bao
 Guang Tian yuan bao

Issued by Wang Zongyan, son of Wang Jian (919–925).
 Qian De yuan bao
 Xian Kang yuan bao
The coins of the Wang family were often of a very poor quality. Wang Jian began his career as a village thief; he enlisted as a soldier, rose through the ranks, and by 901 was virtually an independent ruler, with his capital at Chengdu in Sichuan. His regime provided a peaceful haven for artists and poets.

Min
Issued by Wang Shenzhi:
 Kai Yuan tong bao have a large dot above on the reverse side. They are made of iron and date from 922. The same coin cast in bronze is extremely rare.
 Kai Yuan tong bao have the character Min on the reverse. They are from the Fujian region and made of lead.
 Kai Yuan tong bao have the character Fu on the reverse in reference to Fuzhou. They are made of lead.
In 916, Wang Shenzhi, King of Min, minted a small lead Kai Yuan coin in Ninghua County of Dingzhou Prefecture in Fujian Province, where deposits of lead had been discovered. The lead coins circulated together with copper coins.

Issued by Wang Yanxi:
 Yong Long tong bao have the character Min on the reverse and comes from the Fujian region. There is a crescent below. It is made of iron and dates from 942. One of these large Yong Long coins was worth 10 small coins and 100 lead coins. A string of 500 of these poorly made Min iron coins were popularly called a kao.

Issued by Wang Yanzheng:
 Tian De tong bao are made of iron. When Wang Yanzheng was proclaimed Emperor, he changed the name of the kingdom to Yin, but later restored the name of Min. One of these iron coins, which were cast in 944, was worth 100 ordinary cash.

Chu
Supreme Commander Ma Yin:
 Tian Ce Fu Bao are made of iron. Ma Yin, originally a carpenter, was given the rank of Supreme Commander of Tiance, Hunan, by Emperor Zhu Wen of the Later Liang, and minted this coin in 911 to commemorate the event. Ma Yin later became King Wumu of Chu.
 Qian Feng Quan Bao are made of iron. According to the histories, because there was much lead and iron in Hunan, Ma Yin took the advice of his minister Gao Yu to cast lead and iron coins at Changsha in 925. One of these was worth ten copper cash, and their circulation was confined to Changsha. Merchants traded in these coins, to the benefit of the State. In 2000, a hoard of over 3,000 of these coins was found near Changsha. Extremely rare bronze specimens are also known.
 Qian Yuan zhong bao bear an inscription that is also found on Tang coins. This small lead coin is thought to have been issued by the Chu kingdom. Similar bronze coins are sometimes attributed to Ma Yin, but could be funerary items.

Later Shu
 Da Shu tong bao (Great Shu currency) are attributed to Meng Zhixiang when he became Emperor Gao Zu of Shu in Chengdu in 934. He died three months later. Despite its rarity, some say this coin continued to be cast by his son, Meng Chang, until 937.
 Guang Zheng tong bao are made of bronze and iron. The bronze coins were cast by Meng Chang from the beginning of this period, 938. In 956, iron coins began to be cast to cover additional military expenses. They circulated until 963.

Southern Tang 

Emperor Yuan Zong (Li Jing) (943–961):
 Bao Da yuan bao has on the reverse the character tian above. They are made of iron and date between 943 and 957. There is also an extremely rare bronze example of this coin.
 Yong Tong Quan Huo were produced after 959. Li Jing was short of funds for his army at that time. His minister Zhong Mo obtained permission to cast large coins, one equal to ten, with this inscription. In 964, the coin was withdrawn when Zhong Mo incurred the displeasure of the Emperor.
 Tang Guo tong bao are written in seal, li, and regular script. They date from 959.
 Da Tang tong bao are written in li script and date from 959.

Emperor Li Yu (961–978):
 Kai Yuan tong bao are written in li script and date from 961.

Distinguished from Tang period Kai Yuan by the broader rims, and the characters being in less deep relief.

In the second year of Qiande (961), Li Yu ascended the throne, and the resources of the country being exhausted, his minister Han Xizai obtained permission to cast coins. These were on the Kai Yuan model, but in seal writing devised by the scholar Xu Xuan. This coin was slightly larger than the old Kai Yuans, and had broader rims, and was found convenient by both the government and the people.

 Da Qi tong bao were said to have been cast in 937 by the Prince of Qi or by the founder of the Southern Tang with the original name of the Tang kingdom. Only two specimens were known, and these have now disappeared.

Southern Han
 Kai Ping yuan bao were made from lead. Attributed to Liu Yin, the founder of the Southern Han Kingdom, who apparently cast it to commemorate this Liang dynasty period title (907–910). Excavated in Guangdong.

Emperor Lie Zu (Liu Yan) (917–942):
 Qian Heng tong bao
 Qian Heng zhong bao were made from bronze and lead.
In 917, Liu Yan proclaimed himself Emperor of a dynasty at first called the Great Yue, then the Han, and set up his capital at Canton, which he renamed Xingwangfu.

Crude lead coins 
Attributed to the Southern Han/Chu area (900–971):
 Kai Yuan tong bao are based on Tang dynasty coins. They have a local style with numerous reverse inscriptions – apparently series numbers. There is a very great variety of such coins; some have crescents on the reverse. The Kai character sometimes looks like yong. Characters and legends often reversed because the incompetent workmen had not mastered the art of engraving in negative to make the moulds. Some specimens have meaningless characters.

Wu Wu (五五), Wu Wu Wu (五五五), Wu Wu Wu Wu (五五五五五), Wu Zhu (五朱), and Kai Yuan Wu Wu (開元五五) coins are typical of the hybrid inscriptions formed by combinations of inappropriate characters. They also have series numbers on the reverse.

In 924, it was reported: In the shops and the markets, control of silk and money has resulted in the circulation of small lead coins which we readily find in great quantities; they all come from south of the [Yangtze] river whence the merchants transport them here surreptitiously. In 929, the Chu authorities fixed the value of a lead coin as 1/100 of a bronze coin. In 962, it was decreed that the lead coins should circulate in towns, and copper coins outside of them. Those contravening this risked the death penalty.

Nearly all the coin hoards of this period are of lead coins found in towns, e.g. the Guangfu Road, Guangzhou hoard of 2,000 coins. It is clear that most of these coins were made unofficially by the merchants or the people.

Recently, many inventions, purporting to belong to this series, have appeared on the market.

You Zhou Autonomous Region (900–914)
From 822, the You Zhou (within modern Hebei) area enjoyed virtual independence from the rest of the empire. At the end of the ninth century the Regional Commandant of You Zhou was Liu Rengong, succeeded by his son Liu Shouguang from 911. The histories say that Liu Rengong minted iron coins. He is also said to have ordered his subordinates to collect up all [old?] bronze coins and bring them to Da An mountain where he buried them in a cave. When they had all been hidden away, he killed the workmen and covered over the entrance. The coins below have been found together in the north of China. Opinion on their attribution is divided. Although Yong An was a Xia dynasty period title, these coins appear to be the result of unregulated minting, which seems appropriate for the regime of the Liu family.
 Yong An Yi Shi
 Yong An Yi Bai
 Yong An Wu Bai
 Yong An Yi Qian
The above are found in bronze and iron.
 Wu Zhu are made from iron.
 Huo Bu with the reverse: San Bai.
 Shun Tian yuan bao. are made from iron.
These poorly made coins are imitations of coins of previous regimes and are attributed to the You Zhou.

Song dynasty 

In 960, General Zhao Kuangyin had the throne thrust upon him by mutinous officers. He allowed the Later Zhou family to retire peacefully and established the Song dynasty. Coins were the main basis of the Song monetary system. Cloth had reverted to the status of a commodity. Aided by the exploitation of new copper mines, cash were produced on a large scale. By the Yuanfeng period (1078–1085), casting from 17 different mints produced over five million strings a year of bronze coins. Most mints produced 200,000 strings a year; the largest was named Shao Zhou and located in Guangdong, where there was a large copper mine. It produced 800,000 strings a year. In 1019, the coinage alloy was set at copper 64%, lead 27%, tin 9%. This shows a reduction of nearly 20% in copper content compared with the Tang dynasty Kai Yuan coin.

With so much official coinage available, private coining was generally not a serious problem. Song coins were used over much of Asia, especially in Korea, Japan, Annam, and Indonesia. Hoards of Song coins are often found in these countries.

A wide variety of ordinary cash coin types was produced. The inscription was nearly always changed when the period title was changed. Seal, li, regular, running, and "grass" styles of writing were all used at various times. Many inscriptions were written by the ruling Emperor, which has resulted in some of the most admired and analysed calligraphy to be found on cash coins. In addition, inscriptions could use yuan bao or tong bao, increasing the number of variations possible. Large coins which used zhong bao were also issued in a variety of sizes and nominal denominations, usually devalued soon after issue.

A feature of Northern Song coinage is the sets of dui qian. This means the simultaneous use of two or three different calligraphic styles on coins of the same period title which are otherwise identical in size of hole, width of rim, thickness, size and position of the characters and alloy. One can assume that these congruences arose from the workmanship of the different mints, but no attributions have yet been proposed.

From the beginning of the dynasty, iron coins were extensively used in present-day Sichuan and Shaanxi where copper was not readily available. Between 976 and 984, a total of 100,000 strings of iron coins was produced in Fujian as well. In 993, for paying the land tax one iron coin was equal to one bronze, for the salary of clerks and soldiers one bronze equalled five iron coins, but in trade ten iron coins were needed for one bronze coin. In 1005, four mints in Sichuan produced over 500,000 strings of iron coins a year. This declined to 210,000 strings by the beginning of the Qingli period (1041). At this time, the mints were ordered to cast 3 million strings of iron cash to meet military expenses in Shaanxi. However, by 1056, casting was down to 100,000 strings a year, and in 1059 minting was halted for 10 years in Jiazhou and Qiongzhou, leaving only Xingzhou producing 30,000 strings a year.

During the Xining period (from 1068), minting was increased, and by the Yuanfeng period (from 1078) it was reported that there were nine iron coin mints, three in Sichuan and six in Shaanxi, producing over a million strings a year. Thereafter, output declined gradually.

Emperor Tai Zu (960–976)
 Song Yuan tong bao.. Written in li script. The inscription is based on the Kai Yuan coin. It has a nominal weight of 1 qian. Various dots and crescents are found on the reverse. It was first cast in 960 and then until the end of Tai Zu's reign. Casting of iron coins started at Baizhangxian, Yazhou, in Sichuan, from 970. Ten furnaces cast 9,000 strings a year.

Emperor Tai Zong (976–997)
 Tai Ping tong bao (976–989). Written in li script. Various dots and crescents are found on the reverse. There are also iron coins. The small iron coins come from Sichuan and 10 were equivalent to one bronze coin. The large iron coin have a large dot above on the reverse. This coin was cast at Jianzhou, Fujian in 983, and was intended to be equivalent to 3 bronze coins.

No coins were issued with the Yong Xi and Duan Gong period titles (984–989).

 Chun Hua yuan bao (990–994). Written in regular, running, and grass script. There are also small and large iron coins. They have a nominal value of 10. In 991, 20,000 iron coins were needed in the market for one roll of silk. Permission was requested to alter the casting to Value Ten coins in the Imperial Script pattern. In one year only 3,000 strings were cast. They were not considered convenient, so casting was stopped. 
 Zhi Dao yuan bao (995–997). Written in regular, running, and grass script. During this reign there was an increase in the number of mints in operation. The inscriptions were written by the Emperor Tai Zong himself, who was a noted scholar and calligrapher. The weight of 2,400 small coins was set at 15 jin, so one weighed 1 qian.

Emperor Zhen Zong (998–1022)
 Xian Ping yuan bao (998–1003). Written in regular script. They are found in both bronze and iron.
 Jing De yuan bao (1004–07). Written in regular script. They are made of bronze; Iron with Value Two; or Iron with Value Ten. The large iron coins were minted at Jiazhou and Qiongzhou in Sichuan in 1005. They weighed 4 qian each.
 Xiang Fu yuan bao (1008–1016). Written in regular script. They are made of bronze or iron. They come in medium size and large sizes. The large iron coins were cast from 1014 to 1016 in Yizhou, Sichuan. Their nominal value was 10 cash and weight 3.2 qian.
 Xiang Fu tong bao (1008–1016). Written in regular script.
 Tian Xi tong bao (1017–1022). Written in regular script. They are made of bronze or iron. At this time, there were copper coin mints at Yongping in Jiangxi, Yongfeng in Anhui, Kuangning in Fujian, Fengguo in Shanxi, and in the capital. There were also three iron coin mints in Sichuan.

No coins were produced with the Qian Xing period title, which only lasted one year, 1022.

Emperor Ren Zong (1022–1063)
 Tian Sheng yuan bao (1023–1031). Written in seal, regular and li script.
 Ming Dao yuan bao (1032–1033). Written in seal and regular script. There are iron coins with this inscription.
 Jing You yuan bao (1034–1038). Written in seal and regular script. There are both small and large iron coins.
 Huang Song tong bao (1039–1054) use seal and regular script, and have many variations. They are made of iron and have two forms with either small or large characters. The small character iron coins are associated with casting in Shaanxi and Shanxi in the Qing Li period (from 1044). The large character iron coins are associated with Sichuan mints.

The histories say that the Huang Song coin was cast in Baoyuan 2 – 1039. As it is rather common, and there are no bronze small cash from the next three periods, it appears to have been issued for longer than one year.
 Kang Ding yuan bao (1040). Written in li script. They are made of iron and come in both small and medium sizes.
 Qing Li zhong bao (1041–1048). Written in regular script. There are two forms: large bronze coins and large iron coins. The Qing Li large bronze coins, intended to be worth 10 cash, were cast in Jiangnan to fund the war with the Western Xia. Iron coins were cast in Shanxi and other prefectures. The large coins caused prices to leap up and both public and private interests suffered. In 1048, the large iron coins were devalued to 3 iron cash.
 Zhi He yuan bao (1054–1055). Written in seal, regular, and li script.
 Zhi He tong bao (1054–1055). Written in seal, regular, and li script.
 Jia You yuan bao (1056–1063). Written in seal, regular, and li script.

Yuan dynasty

Ming dynasty

Qing dynasty

See also 

 History of Chinese currency
 China Numismatic Museum
 China Numismatic Society
 Jin dynasty coinage (1115–1234)
 Kucha coinage
 Liao dynasty coinage
 List of Chinese cash coins by inscription
 Sycee (yuanbao), the gold and silver ingots also used as currency under imperial China
 Western Xia coinage

References

Citations

Sources 

 
 David Hartill. CAST CHINESE COINS (Second Edition). New Generation Publishing 2017.
 The Daniel K.E. Ching Sale. June 2, 1991. Scott Semans, Seattle.
 Fisher's Ding. An annotated version of the Ding Fubao catalogue prepared by George A. Fisher, Jr. Colorado, 1990.
 Richard Von Glahn. Fountain of Fortune (Money and Monetary Policy in China 1000–1700).California, 1996.
 Norman F. Gorny. Northern Song Dynasty Cash Variety Guide. Volume 1 Fugo Senshu. USA, 2001.
 David Hartill. Qing Cash (Royal Numismatic Society Special Publication 37). London, 2003.
 Charles O. Hucker. A Dictionary of Official Titles in Imperial China. California, 1985.
 Peng Xinwei. A Monetary History of China (Zhongguo Huobi Shi). Trans. Edward H. Kaplan. Western Washington University, 1994.
 F. Schjoth. Chinese Currency. London, 1929.
 François Thierry. Monnaies chinoises: I L'Antiquite preimperiale. Paris, 1997. II Des Qin aux Cinq Dynasties. Paris, 2003.
 Tung Tso Pin. Chronological Tables of Chinese History. Hong Kong, 1960.
 D.C. Twitchett. Financial Administration under the T'ang Dynasty. Cambridge, 1970.
 Wang Yu-Chuan. Early Chinese Coinage. New York, 1980.
 Xinjiang Numismatics. Ed. Zhu Yuanjie et al. Hong Kong, 1991.
 《大泉圖錄》 Da Quan Tulu (Register of Large Cash). 鮑康 Bao Kang. Peking, 1876.
 《古钱大辞典》 Gu Qian Da Cidian (Encyclopaedia of Old Coins). 丁福保 Ding Fubao. Shanghai, 1936.
 《開元通寶系年考》 Kai Yuan Tong Bao Xi Nian Hui Kao (Kai Yuan Tong Bao. A Chronological Classification). 杜维善 顾小坤 Dun Weishan & Gu Xiaokun. Shanghai, 1996.
 《兩宋鐵錢》 Liang Song Tie Qian (Iron Coins of the Two Song Dynasties). 閻福善 Yan Fushan (et al. eds). Peking, 2000.
 《清朝錢譜》 Shincho Senpu. (Qing Dynasty Cash Register). Hanawa Shiro. Tokyo, 1968.
 《太平天國錢幣》 Taiping Tianguo Qianbi (Coins of the Taiping Heavenly Kingdom). 馬定祥 馬傅德 Ma Dingxiang & Ma Fude. Shanghai, 1983.
 《咸豐泉匯》 Xianfeng Quan Hui (A Collection of Xianfeng Coins). 馬定祥 Ma Dingxiang. Shanghai, 1994.
 《中國古錢目錄》 Zhongguo Gu Qian Mulu (Catalogue of Old Chinese Coins). 華光普 Hua Guangpu. Hunan, 1998.
 《中國錢幣大辭典 － 先秦編》 Zhongguo Qianbi Da Cidian – Xian Qin Bian (Chinese Coin Encyclopaedia – Early Times to Qin). 李葆華 Li Paohua (ed.). Peking, 1995.

External links 
 Ancient Chinese Coins website - Nonprofit with much information and hundreds of images.
 Calgary coins description of the history of chinese coins (with images)
 Chinese Numismatics in Hong Kong
 Chinesecoins.com: Old Chinese coins.
 Dragon Dollar & Chinese Coins: Late Qing dynasty machine struck Chinese coins.
 Primaltrek: Detailed information about cast coins from every period of Chinese history, and the economic conditions that lead to their production.

 
Cash coins
Coins
Numismatics
Chinese numismatics